Grenada competed at the 1992 Summer Olympics in Barcelona, Spain with four athletes, all competing in track and field.

Competitors
The following is the list of number of competitors in the Games.

Results by event

Athletics
Men's 100m metres
Gabriel Simeon 
 Heat — 11.10 (→ did not advance, 65th place)

Men's Long Jump
Eugene Licorish
 Qualification — 7.60 m (→ did not advance, 13th place)

Men's 400m metres
Delon Felix 
 Heat — 47.39 (→ did not advance, 5th place)

Women's 400m metres
Shermaine Ross  
 Heat — 55.49 (→ did not advance, 6th place)

See also
Grenada at the 1991 Pan American Games

References

Sources
Official Olympic Reports
sports-reference

Nations at the 1992 Summer Olympics
1992
Olympics